NPO 1 Extra is a television channel jointly operated by Dutch public broadcasters AVROTROS, BNNVARA, EO, KRO-NCRV and MAX. It was originally launched as HilversumBest on 1 December 2006. NPO 1 Extra presents highlights of more than sixty years of Dutch television history. The channel was founded by Han Peekel.

History
In April 2009, HilversumBest was renamed as Best24. On 10 March 2014 the channel changed its name to NPO Best. On 26 March 2018 the channel was renamed as NPO 1 Extra.

NPO 1 Extra (along with NPO Zapp Extra) became a 24-hour channel on 25 December 2018. Previously, NPO 1 Extra time-shared with NPO Zapp Xtra.

Programming
NPO 1 Extra broadcasts programmes created by the public broadcasters from the NPO. Most programmes are from the archives of the Netherlands Institute for Sound and Vision. NPO 1 Extra is mainly focused on programmes from the eighties and nineties of the last century. Television programmes from other decades regularly passes in shortened or compiled versions. NPO 1 Extra has a linear programming with many regular program titles in the early evening. The soap Onderweg naar morgen and the comedy series Zeg 'ns AAA are scheduled daily on NPO Best.

Logos and identities

References

External links 
 Official Website NPO 1 Extra
 Official Website NPO

Television channels in the Netherlands
Television channels and stations established in 2006
2006 establishments in the Netherlands